The saddled galaxias (Galaxias tanycephalus) is a species of fish in the family Galaxiidae. It is endemic to Tasmania.

References

saddled galaxias
Freshwater fish of Tasmania
Endemic fauna of Tasmania
Vulnerable fauna of Australia
saddled galaxias
Taxonomy articles created by Polbot